Achilleio is a former municipality on the island of Corfu, Ionian Islands, Greece. Since the 2019 local government reform it is part of the municipality Central Corfu and Diapontia Islands, of which it is a municipal unit. It is located in the south-central part of the island of Corfu, south of Corfu (city). It has a land area of 48.650 km² and a population of 10,651 inhabitants (2011 census). The seat of the municipality was the town of Gastouri (pop. 953). The municipality took its name from the palace Achilleion that Empress Elisabeth of Austria built there. The largest towns are Kynopiastes (pop. 1,054), Viros (1,201), Perama (1,021), Benítses (843), Káto Garoúna (579), and Kastellánoi (496).

References

Populated places in Corfu (regional unit)